The yellow-eared spiderhunter (Arachnothera chrysogenys) is a species of bird in the family Nectariniidae.
It is found in Brunei, Indonesia, Malaysia, Myanmar, Singapore, Thailand, and Vietnam.
Its natural habitats are subtropical or tropical moist lowland forests, subtropical or tropical mangrove forests, and subtropical or tropical moist montane forests.

References

External links
 Image at ADW

yellow-eared spiderhunter
Birds of Malesia
yellow-eared spiderhunter
Taxonomy articles created by Polbot